Teofil Antoni Jaksa of Griffins Kwiatkowski (February 21, 1809 in PułtuskAugust 14, 1891 in Avallon, France) was a Polish painter.

Life
Kwiatkowski participated in the November 1830 Uprising.  After its suppression, he emigrated to France.

His artistic work includes many images of Frédéric Chopin, including a picture of him playing at a ball at Paris's Hôtel Lambert and Chopin on His Deathbed (1849).

See also
 Great Emigration
 List of Poles

Notes

References
"Kwiatkowski, Teofil Antoni," Encyklopedia powszechna PWN, vol. 2, Warsaw, Państwowe Wydawnictwo Naukowe, 1974, pp. 658–59.

1809 births
1891 deaths
19th-century Polish painters
19th-century Polish male artists
People from Pułtusk
Polish male painters